Cassinelli is a Peruvian range of soft drinks. Cassinelli is a brand of the Enrique Cassinelli and Sons company in Trujillo, Peru, and is sold in glass bottles of 296 ml and in PET bottles of 296 ml, 510 ml, 1.5 litre, 1.75 litre and 3.020 litre.

External links
  Official website of Enrique Cassinelli and Sons

References

Cola brands
Peruvian drinks
Brands of Trujillo, Peru